The following is a list of current National Hockey League (NHL) Western Conference team rosters:

Pacific Division

Anaheim Ducks

Calgary Flames

Edmonton Oilers

Los Angeles Kings

San Jose Sharks

Seattle Kraken

Vancouver Canucks

Vegas Golden Knights

Central Division

Arizona Coyotes

Chicago Blackhawks

Colorado Avalanche

Dallas Stars

Minnesota Wild

Nashville Predators

St. Louis Blues

Winnipeg Jets

See also
List of current NHL Eastern Conference team rosters

References

Western Conference (NHL)
NHL Western Conference team rosters